Oreonebria atrata is a species of ground beetle in the Nebriinae subfamily that is endemic to Austria.

References

atrata
Beetles described in 1826
Endemic fauna of Austria
Beetles of Europe